The following is a list of defunct airlines of the United States. However, some of these airlines have ceased operations completely, changed identities and/or FAA certificates and are still operating under a different name (e.g. America West Airlines changed to use the identity of US Airways in 2005 - which itself also changed identity to American Airlines in 2015).

For reasons of size, this article is broken into four parts:
List of defunct airlines of the United States (A–C)
List of defunct airlines of the United States (D–I)
List of defunct airlines of the United States (J–P)
List of defunct airlines of the United States (Q–Z)

See also 

List of airlines of the United States
List of airports in the United States
List of defunct airlines of Guam
List of defunct airlines of Puerto Rico
List of defunct airlines of the United States Virgin Islands

United States
Airlines, defunct
Airlines
Defunct